"Trendy" is a song by Cadet featuring Ay Em and Tion Wayne. It was released on 30 December 2018 and peaked at number 99 on the UK Singles Chart. This would be Cadet's last single released during his lifetime, despite future posthumous releases.

Track listing

Charts

References

2018 songs
2018 singles
Cadet (rapper) songs
Tion Wayne songs